The Juan Fernández Ridge is a volcanic island and seamount chain on the Nazca Plate. It runs in a west–east direction from the Juan Fernández hotspot to the Peru–Chile Trench at a latitude of  33° S near Valparaíso. The Juan Fernández Islands are the only seamounts that reach the surface.

Subduction of the ridge beneath South America is thought to have caused the Pampean flat-slab and its associated inland tectonic deformation and reduced magmatic activity.

References

 

Juan Fernández Islands
Underwater ridges of the Pacific Ocean
Oceanography
Hotspot tracks
Volcanoes of Valparaíso Region